The Laykyun Sekkya Buddha is, as of 2018, the third-tallest statue in the world at .

Details
This statue of Gautama Buddha stands on a  throne located in the village of Khatakan Taung, near Monywa, Myanmar. Construction began in 1996 and it was completed on 21 February 2008. It was commissioned by the Chief Abbot Ven. Nãradã.. It was the tallest statue in the world for a few months until the completion of the Spring Temple Buddha in September 2008. The Laykyun Sekkya statue depicts a standing Gautama Buddha next to a reclining statue of Gautama Buddha, depicting the scene of Mahaparinirvana (Mahaparinibbana).

See also

List of tallest statues
Chaukhtatgyi Buddha Temple
Maha Bodhi Tahtaung

Gallery

References

External links

Colossal Buddha statues
Colossal statues
Concrete Buddha statues
Outdoor sculptures
Monuments and memorials in Myanmar
2008 sculptures
Concrete sculptures
Religious buildings and structures completed in 2008
2008 establishments in Myanmar
Statues in Myanmar